Valery Afanassiev (Valerij Pavlovič Afanasiev; born 8 September 1947) is a Russian pianist, writer and conductor.

Life 
Valery Afanassiev was born in Moscow. He studied piano at the Academic Music College and Moscow Conservatory with Emil Gilels and Yakov Zak. He was the winner of the Bach Competition in Leipzig in 1968, as well as 1st prize recipient at the Concours Reine Elisabeth in Brussels in 1971. Shortly after, while touring around Belgium, he decided to seek political asylum, and was eventually granted Belgian citizenship.

Afanassiev  lives in Versailles.

Work and critical reception 
Afanassiev become widely known in the 1980s due to his musical partnership with Gidon Kremer. Their joint recordings of chamber works by Mozart, Schubert, and Brahms were highly praised.  His interpretations of solo piano works by Franz Schubert, Ludwig van Beethoven and the others have aroused controversy on account of Afanassiev's tempi choices and idiosyncratic expressiveness. One review of his recording of Schubert's last three piano sonatas stated: "the perversity encountered here so angered me that I felt I could not dignify what I found here with any kind of coherent analysis".

Afanassiev is also a writer of poetry, novels, and drama. He is also an orchestral conductor.

References

External links 
 Official website of the artist
 Alain Pâris: Dictionnaire des interpretes et de l'interpretation musicale au XX siecle. Éditions Robert Laffont, Paris 1989.
 Alan Rich: Masters of music. Great artists of work. Capra Press, Santa Barbara, California 1990.

Russian classical pianists
Male classical pianists
1947 births
Living people
Prize-winners of the Queen Elisabeth Competition
21st-century Russian conductors (music)
Russian male conductors (music)
21st-century Russian male musicians
21st-century classical pianists